Thermopsis rhombifolia, also known as prairie thermopsis, is a flowering plant in the legume family. It is native to North America, where it is found in the Great Plains, with extensions into the lower canyons of the Rocky Mountains. Its natural habitat is dry grasslands and woodlands.

It is a perennial herb that produces yellow flowers in the spring.

Usage
The flowers were commonly used by the natives as a source of yellow dye and were boiled in a tea as a cure for stomach ailments for people and horses. The plant has toxic properties if ingested; symptoms of poisoning include vomiting, dizziness, and abdominal pain.

References

Sophoreae
Flora of the Great Plains (North America)
Flora of Western Canada
Flora of the Western United States
Flora of the United States
Flora of the Rocky Mountains
Flora of Colorado
Flora of Montana
Flora of New Mexico
Flora of Wyoming
Plants used in traditional Native American medicine
Garden plants of North America
Flora without expected TNC conservation status